In molecular biology, R64/Z200 is a member of the C/D class of small nucleolar RNA which guide the site-specific 2'-O-methylation of substrate RNA. This family can be found in Arabidopsis thaliana (R64) and  Oryza sativa (Z200).

References

External links 
 

Small nuclear RNA